Merefa is a city in eastern Ukraine. It is located in Kharkiv Raion (district) of Kharkiv Oblast (province). Merefa hosts the administration of Merefa urban hromada, one of the hromadas of Ukraine. Population:

History 
It was a village in Kharkov uyezd of Kharkov Governorate of the Russian Empire.

City since 1938.

In January 1989 the population was 28 952 people.

In January 2013 the population was 22 280 people.

Transport 
 a railway station

Gallery

References

Cities in Kharkiv Oblast
Kharkovsky Uyezd
Cities of district significance in Ukraine
Cities and towns built in the Sloboda Ukraine